Weightlifting at the 1976 Summer Paralympics consisted of six events for men.

Participating nations 
There were 43 male competitors representing 16 nations.

Medal summary

Medal table 
There were 18 medal winners representing nine nations.

Men's events

References 

 

1976 Summer Paralympics events
1976
Paralympics